Cobb's Arm  is a local service district and designated place in the Canadian province of Newfoundland and Labrador on New World Island. It is located about 8 km outside Newville and leads to other communities such as Pikes Arm and Toogood Arm.

Geography 
Cobbs Arm is in Newfoundland within Subdivision H of Division No. 8.

Demographics 

Government 
Cobbs Arm is a local service district (LSD) that is governed by a committee responsible for the provision of certain services to the community. The chair of the LSD committee is Lisa Stuckey.

See also 
List of communities in Newfoundland and Labrador
List of designated places in Newfoundland and Labrador
List of local service districts in Newfoundland and Labrador

References 

Populated coastal places in Canada
Designated places in Newfoundland and Labrador
Local service districts in Newfoundland and Labrador